David Acord is an American sound editor and voice actor best known for his contribution as a supervising sound editor of the 2015 film Star Wars: The Force Awakens. Acord received a nomination for the Academy Award for Best Sound Editing and British Academy Film Award for Best Sound for his work on The Force Awakens, with fellow sound editor Matthew Wood. He also provided the voice of several characters in the film, including the stormtrooper FN-2199 (often known as TR-8R). Though the voice role is minimal, the character gained considerable attention on the Internet following the film's release. Acord also had minor voice roles as an Imperial Male PA and two stormtroopers on episodes of Star Wars Rebels. In 2015, Acord was one of the sound designers for Disney Infinity video game. In 2020, he received his second Academy Award nomination for Best Sound Editing for 2019 film Star Wars: The Rise of Skywalker, shared with Matthew Wood.

Life and career
David Acord grew up in Delaware. He is a fan of the Philadelphia Eagles, going as far as to put references to the Eagles inside of Rogue One.

Filmography

Sound editing

 The Mandalorian (2019 - 2021)
 Star Wars: The Force Awakens (2015)... (supervising sound editor)
 Star Wars Rebels (2014 - 2015) ... (TV Series) (sound designer, supervising sound editor)
 Avengers: Age of Ultron (2015) ... (sound designer)
 Day One (2015) (Short) ... (sound re-recording mixer)
 Inherent Vice (2014) ... (re-recording mixer)
 Guardians of the Galaxy (2014) ... (sound designer)
 Captain America: The Winter Soldier (2014) ... (sound effects editor)
 Chef (2014) ... (sound effects editor - uncredited)
 Star Wars: The Clone Wars (2008-2014) (TV Series) ... (sound designer)
 Thor: The Dark World (2014) ... (additional sound design)
 Star Trek Into Darkness (2013) ... (sound effects editor)
 America 101 (2013) (Short) ... (sound re-recording mixer)
 Monster Roll (2012) (Short) ... (sound designer) / (sound re-recording mixer)
 Lego Star Wars: The Empire Strikes Out (2012) (TV Movie) ... (sound designer)
 The Master (2012) ... (sound effects editor)
 Zambezia (2012) ... (rerecording mixer) / (sound designer)
 Red Tails (2012) ... (re-recording mixer) / (sound designer)
 Super 8 (2011) ... (sound effects editor)
 Star Tours: The Adventures Continue (2011) (Short) ... (sound effects editor)
 Crazy Beats Strong Every Time (2011) (Short) ... (sound designer)
 Gun Hill Road ... (2011) (sound re-recording mixer)
 Clone Wars Adventures (2010) (Video Game) ... (sound designer)
 Fanboys (2009) ... (sound designer)
 Robot Chicken: Star Wars Episode II (2008) (TV Short) ... (sound designer)
 Star Wars: The Clone Wars (2008) ... (sound designer / sound editor)
 Lifted (2007) (Short) ... (sound designer)
 Zoom (2006) ... (assistant sound designer)
 Clerks II (2006) ... (sound effects editor)
 Cars (2006) ... (assistant supervising sound editor)
 Ice Age: The Meltdown (2006) ... (assistant sound editor)
 Feast (2005) ... (sound designer)
 Moongirl (2005) (Short) ... (sound effects editor)
 Star Wars: Episode III – Revenge of the Sith (2005) ... (assistant sound editor)
 Tweek City (2005) ... (boom operator)
 Psychonauts (2005) (Video Game) ... (sound editor - uncredited)
 The Incredibles (2004) ... (assistant supervising sound editor)
 The Dust Factory (2004) ... (assistant sound editor)
 Jersey Girl (2004) ... (apprentice sound editor)
 Adventures in Animation 3D (2004) (Short) ... (assistant sound designer)
 Bayside Shakedown 2 (2003) ... (assistant sound editor)
 Girls Club (2002) (TV Series) ... (utility sound)
 Men in Black II (2002)... (communications mixer - uncredited)
 Star Wars: Episode II – Attack of the Clones (2002) ... (apprentice sound editor)
 Big Trouble (2002) ... (utility sound - uncredited)
 Daddy and Them (2001) ... (utility sound)
 Unbreakable (2000) ... (utility cable)
 The Patriot (2000) ... (utility sound)
 North Beach (2000) ... (sound mixer)
 Sleepy Hollow (1999) ... (utility sound - uncredited)
 The '60s (1999) (TV Movie) ... (utility sound)
 Virus (1999) ... (cable person)
 Belly (1998) ... (boom operator)
 Legacy (1998) (TV Series) ... (utility sound)
 Fear and Loathing in Las Vegas (1998) ... (utility sound technician)
 Brave New World (1998) (TV Movie) ... (utility sound)
 Hush (1998) ... (cable person)
 Fallen (1998) ... (boom operator)
 The Night Flier (1997) ... (utility sound)
 Prince Street (1997) (TV Series) ... (utility sound)
 Nash Bridges (1996) (TV Series) ... (utility sound)

Awards and recognitions

References

External links
 

American sound editors
Living people
American male voice actors
Year of birth missing (living people)
Place of birth missing (living people)
Actors from Delaware
Salesianum School alumni